Webb Icefall is an icefall just south of Vishniac Peak that descends from Willett Range and nourishes the western tributary at the head of Webb Glacier, in Victoria Land. Named by American geologist Parker E. Calkin in association with Webb Glacier.

Icefalls of Antarctica
Landforms of Victoria Land
Scott Coast
Webb